Mitchell Shannon Berger (born June 24, 1972) is a Canadian former American football punter. He played college football at Colorado and was drafted by the Philadelphia Eagles in the sixth round of the 1994 NFL Draft.

Berger has also been a member of the Cincinnati Bengals, Chicago Bears, Indianapolis Colts, Green Bay Packers, Minnesota Vikings, St. Louis Rams, New Orleans Saints, Arizona Cardinals, Pittsburgh Steelers and Denver Broncos. He won Super Bowl XLIII with the Steelers against the Cardinals.

Early years
Berger attended North Delta Senior Secondary School in Delta, British Columbia and was a letterman in football and basketball. In football, as a senior, he won All-Provincial honours as both, a kicker and as a punter, and was also the team's starting quarterback. In basketball, he won All-Provincial honours. Mitch Berger graduated from North Delta Secondary School in 1990.

College career
Berger attended Tyler Junior College in Tyler, Texas and won honourable mention All-American honours as a sophomore. He finished his college career by transferring to the University of Colorado.

Professional career

Philadelphia Eagles
Berger was drafted by the Philadelphia Eagles in the sixth round of the 1994 NFL Draft. He was also drafted in the first round of the 1994 CFL Draft by the Winnipeg Blue Bombers.

Minnesota Vikings
Perhaps Berger's best seasons came as a member of the Minnesota Vikings in the late 1990s. He was most noted for his booming kickoffs, which often sailed into the end zone for touchbacks; afterwards, he would take a bite of a Snickers bar that he would keep in his spare shoe on the sideline.

Pittsburgh Steelers

Berger was signed by the Pittsburgh Steelers after an injury to punter Daniel Sepulveda to compete with signing Paul Ernster. Berger won the job as Paul Ernster was released on August 30 during final cuts. After experiencing hamstring problems, Berger was released by the Steelers on November 5 and the team re-signed Ernster. Following three poor performances by Ernster, Berger was re-signed by the Steelers on November 24. Berger developed into a great tackling punter, as evidenced by his five tackles in the 2008 season. He had two key touchdown-saving tackles.

Berger won his first Super Bowl with the Steelers at Super Bowl XLIII in which he had three punts for a 46.3 yard average and one inside the 20 yard-line.

Denver Broncos
Berger signed with the Denver Broncos on October 26, 2009, after they waived Brett Kern.  He was released after the 2009 season.

Personal life
Berger owns a set of nightclubs and restaurants in his hometown of Vancouver, British Columbia. He appeared on Millionaire Matchmaker on March 12, 2013 and is now married to Bambi.

References

External links

Arizona Cardinals bio
Pittsburgh Steelers bio

1972 births
Living people
American football punters
Arizona Cardinals players
Canadian expatriate American football people in the United States
Canadian players of American football
Chicago Bears players
Cincinnati Bengals players
Colorado Buffaloes football players
Denver Broncos players
Indianapolis Colts players
Minnesota Vikings players
National Conference Pro Bowl players
New Orleans Saints players
People from Delta, British Columbia
Philadelphia Eagles players
Pittsburgh Steelers players
Sportspeople from Kamloops
St. Louis Rams players
Tyler Apaches football players
Green Bay Packers players